Évian-les-Bains station is a railway station serving the town Évian-les-Bains, Haute-Savoie department, southeastern France. The station is served by regional trains towards Lyon, Annemasse and Geneva, and high speed trains to Paris (weekends and holidays).

References

External links
 

Railway stations in Haute-Savoie